George Frederic Kribbs (November 8, 1846 – September 8, 1938) was an American lawyer and politician who served as a Democratic member of the U.S. House of Representatives from Pennsylvania.

Biography
George F. Kribbs was born on a farm in Clarion County, Pennsylvania.  He attended the common schools and the Emlenton Academy and graduated from Muhlenberg College in Allentown, Pennsylvania, in 1873.  He studied law, was admitted to the bar in 1875 and commenced practice in Clarion, Pennsylvania.  He was elected as mayor of Clarion in 1876 and again in 1889.  He edited the Clarion Democrat from 1877 to 1889.

Kribbs was elected as a Democrat to the Fifty-second and Fifty-third Congresses, serving from 1891 to 1895.  He was an unsuccessful candidate for renomination in 1894.  He resumed the practice of law in Clarion, and again served as mayor.  He was president of the board of directors of the Clarion State Normal School.  He moved to Osceola County, Florida, in 1896 and engaged in growing oranges. He re-engaged the practice of law located in Kissimmee, Florida, in 1907.  He served as prosecuting attorney of Osceola County in 1908, and judge of the county court in 1909 and 1910.  He resigned and resumed the practice of law in Kissimmee until 1926 when he retired.  He died in Kissimmee in 1938, and was interred in Violet Hill Cemetery.

Sources

The Political Graveyard

External links

1846 births
1938 deaths
Pennsylvania lawyers
Florida lawyers
Democratic Party members of the United States House of Representatives from Pennsylvania
People from Clarion County, Pennsylvania
Mayors of places in Pennsylvania
People from Kissimmee, Florida
Muhlenberg College alumni